Sonja Ashauer (9 April 1923 – 21 August 1948) was a Brazilian physicist. She was the first Brazilian woman to earn a doctorate in physics and the second to become a physics graduate in Brazil.

Biography
Born in São Paulo, Ashauer was the daughter of the German-born engineer Walter Ashauer and his wife Herta Graffenbenger. From 1935 to 1939, she pursued her secondary education at Gymnasium of São Paulo state capital. Encouraged by her father, after secondary school, she studied physics under Gleb Wataghin at the University of São Paulo, graduating in 1942. She was the second female physics graduate in Brazil, the first being Yolande Monteux who graduated in 1938.

In January 1948, she became the first woman from Brazil to be awarded a doctorate in physics after studying for three years at the University of Cambridge under the Nobel prizewinner Paul Dirac. She was said to have been a brilliant student. Her thesis (Problems in electrons and electromagnetic radiation) explored the cutting-edge field of quantum electrodynamics. In March 1948, she returned to Brazil where she was appointed as Wataghin's assistant.

Ashauer was the first woman from Brazil elected as a member of the Cambridge Philosophical Society.

Later that year, after catching a cold on a rainy day she contracted pneumonia. She was taken to hospital but she died six days later on 21 August 1948. The cause of death stated on the death certificate was "broncopneumonia, myocarditis, and heart failure".

Publications

References

20th-century Brazilian physicists
1923 births
1948 deaths
Brazilian women physicists
Brazilian women scientists
Brazilian people of German descent
Alumni of the University of Cambridge
University of São Paulo alumni
People from São Paulo
20th-century Brazilian women scientists
Brazilian expatriates in the United Kingdom